The Gartempe is a French river,  long. It is a left tributary of the Creuse, which it joins in La Roche-Posay. Its source is in the municipality of Peyrabout.

Among its tributaries are the Anglin, the Brame, the Semme and the Ardour.

The Gartempe flows generally northwest through the following departments and towns:
 Creuse: Peyrabout, Le Grand-Bourg
 Indre: Néons-sur-Creuse
 Indre-et-Loire: Yzeures-sur-Creuse
 Haute-Vienne: Châteauponsac, Rancon
 Vienne: Montmorillon, Saint-Savin, La Roche-Posay

References

Rivers of France
Rivers of Nouvelle-Aquitaine
Rivers of Centre-Val de Loire
Rivers of Creuse
Rivers of Indre
Rivers of Indre-et-Loire
Rivers of Haute-Vienne
Rivers of Vienne